Lisa J. Fauci (born September 21, 1960) is an American mathematician who applies computational fluid dynamics to biological processes such as sperm motility and phytoplankton dynamics. More generally, her research interests include numerical analysis, scientific computing, and mathematical biology. She is the Pendergraft Nola Lee Haynes Professor of Mathematics at Tulane University, and president of the Society for Industrial and Applied Mathematics.

Education
Fauci was born in Brooklyn, New York. She did her undergraduate studies at Pace University, where she was encouraged to continue in mathematics by her mentor there, Michael Bernkopf. After earning a B.S. in mathematics in 1981, she went on to graduate studies at the Courant Institute of Mathematical Sciences of New York University, completing a master's degree in 1984 and her doctorate in 1986, under the supervision of Charles S. Peskin.

Career 
Fauci has been at Tulane University since 1986. In 2017 she was elected president of the Society for Industrial and Applied Mathematics (SIAM).

Recognition
In 2012 Fauci became a fellow of the Society for Industrial and Applied Mathematics "for contributions to computational biofluid dynamics and applications." In 2016 she was selected as the annual Sonia Kovalevsky Lecturer by the Association for Women in Mathematics. In 2018, she became a Fellow of the American Physical Society.

In 2019 Fauci was elected fellow of the American Association for the Advancement of Science (AAAS). She was elected as a Fellow of the American Mathematical Society in the 2020 Class, for "contributions to computational fluid dynamics and applications, and for service to the applied mathematical community".

Fauci was elected to the 2023 class of fellows of the Association for Women in Mathematics "for her vision of advancing women in the mathematical sciences; for executing that vision by encouraging women to pursue graduate studies and providing sustained mentorship throughout their careers; and for opening pathways for the broader inclusion of women through her leadership in international organizations such as SIAM."

References

External links
Lisa Fauci's home page.
.

1960 births
Living people
20th-century American mathematicians
21st-century American mathematicians
American women mathematicians
Pace University alumni
Courant Institute of Mathematical Sciences alumni
Tulane University faculty
Fellows of the American Mathematical Society
Fellows of the Society for Industrial and Applied Mathematics
20th-century women mathematicians
21st-century women mathematicians
20th-century American women
21st-century American women
Fellows of the American Physical Society